The J. J. Walser Jr. residence in the Chicago, United States, neighborhood of Austin was designed by Frank Lloyd Wright for real estate developer Joseph Jacob Walser Jr. The cruciform two-story house is typical of Wright's Prairie School period.

History
Joseph J. and Grace Walser purchased the lot at 417 South Central Avenue (re-designated 42 North Central Avenue in 1909) in Austin, Chicago on February 20, 1903. Walser worked for his father, Jacob Walser, a real estate developer who focused on the Austin market. At the time, Central Avenue was undeveloped, despite its location near a Lake Street Elevated Railroad station. The Walser family grew up in a house one block to the north and Jacob still lived there.

It is not known how the Walsers came in contact with architect Frank Lloyd Wright. As developers, the Walsers were more knowledgeable about local architectural trends and probably were aware of Wright's rising status. A permit for Walser's house was approved on May 22, 1903. The house cost $4,000 and was completed by the end of the year. It is not certain who was tasked with building the structure, as C. Iverson is listed on the permit but later sources attribute it to Elmer E. Andrews. After completion, the house appeared in "Plaster Houses and their Construction", an article in House Beautiful in September 1905. The house was also part of Wright's Wasmuth Portfolio. The Walsers lived in the house for seven years. In 1910, when the Walsers moved six blocks east, the house was sold to George Donnersberger. Since then, the house has had a dozen owners, although it has remained in the hands of the Teague family since 1970. The house was recognized by the City of Chicago as a Chicago Landmark on March 30, 1984, and recognized by the National Park Service with a listing on the National Register of Historic Places on April 23, 2013.

Architecture
The east (main) facade of the Walser House faces Central Avenue. Today, it is one of the few single-family homes in the neighborhood, as most of Central Avenue is now walk-ups and apartment buildings. The exterior of the house is mostly white stucco. A two-story living room and bedroom block dominated the main facade. Typical of the Prairie School, it has a low-pitched hipped roof with deep overhanging eaves. Along the second story, immediately under the roof-line, is a horizontal band of five square casement windows with dark wood frames. The first floor has a centered, large window assembly with a picture window flanked with narrow casement windows. Flanking the main section are one-story porches, recessed from the front of the house. These porches were enclosed some time after 1903. The main entrance is to the west of the southern porch; like many of Wright's designs, it is hidden from street view. An addition, one room deep, was constructed on the west some time after 1903. The garage in the rear of the property was built at or near the time of the house construction. The design of the house served as the basis for Wright's Barton House in Buffalo, New York.

References

William Allin Storrer, The Frank Lloyd Wright Companion. University of Chicago Press, 2006, (S.091)

External links
A site about Walser House

Frank Lloyd Wright buildings
Houses completed in 1903
Houses on the National Register of Historic Places in Chicago
Chicago Landmarks